HD 10455, also known as HR 4595, is a star located in the southern circumpolar constellation Octans. It has an apparent magnitude of 6.02, allowing it to be faintly visible to the naked eye. Based on parallax measurements from Gaia Data Release 3, it is estimated to be 336 light years distant.

This is an evolved, orange hued giant star with a stellar classification of K3 III. It is currently on the horizontal branch, generating energy via helium fusion at its core. It has twice the mass of the Sun but at 955 million years old, it has expanded to 9.82 times its girth. HD 10455 has an iron abundance 12% below solar levels, making it slightly metal deficient.

It is a main sequence star with a spectral class of F8, and is estimated to be around the same distance as HD 104555.

References

K-type giants
Horizontal-branch stars
Octans
Octantis, 12
PD-84 00371
104555
058697
4595
Double stars
F-type main-sequence stars